DiRT: Origin of the Species is a third-personal action-adventure computer game with action elements developed by British studio Nu Generation Games and published by Tri Synergy in 2006. It was published by Nobilis in France and THQ Entertainment in Germany.

Plot and gameplay 
Eva Cash, also called Dirt, wakes up in a prison cell and must work out what happened to her.

The game plays like a  typical third-person-shooter where Eva travels through mostly linear levels in search for an exit. The game contained over 20 weapons.

Development 
Nu Generation Games was founded in 2002 in Nottingham, UK, and their members came from Core Design / Eidos PLC. The company was founded to create original games that weren't bound by the restrictions of licences titles.

The game was announced in a press release on 21/05/2004, and Nu Generation and Tri Synergy released the first 8 game screenshots on 12/20/2004. The game was originally scheduled for Spring 2005 but this was delayed in March 2005. Two trailers were released in anticipation for E3 2005. A Russian-language site featuring extra information about the game was unveiled by Nu Generation on September 6, 2006. By November 20, 2006, the PC version of the game was ready to be published in the US. It was original meant to be released on PC in France in April 2007, but by mid 2007, the game was yet to be released on the PC and Playstation. In March 2007, Nobilis France held a competition to find a lookalike Eva Cash. The publisher unveiled the official French website for the game in April of that year.

The game has been known as: Origin of The Species, D1RT, DiRT: Origin of The Species, and Eva Cash: DiRT project.

Critical reception 
Jeuxvideo felt the game's good ideas were let down by the "obsolete and ill-conceived game mechanics". Gameswelt felt the story was "pretty stupid". 4Players felt that the game exemplifies the perception that the better a game's box art was, the more the developers were trying to hide. Gry Online acknowledged the game's advanced graphics engine. Gamezone felt that character animations were choppy and that it would appeal to those who were having a withdrawal from a lack of Tomb Raider-esque games. Gamespot criticised the game's numerous bugs. ComputerBills felt the name 'Dirt' was an apt name because the game came across as filth (German for 'dirt' is 'dreck', which also means filth). Gamer.no felt the game was a low budget title with archaic graphics and lots of bugs.

The game won the 4Players award for 2007 – Worst Game of the Year.

References

External links 

 Russian main page
 French main page
 Information on Nu Generations page

2006 video games
Third-person shooters
Video games developed in the United Kingdom
Windows games
Windows-only games
Tri Synergy games